The Barmer Spitze is a peak of the Rieserferner group on the border between Tyrol, Austria, and South Tyrol, Italy.

References 
 Werner Beikircher: Rieserfernergruppe (Alpine Club Guide) Bergverlag Rother, 1983.

External links 

Mountains of the Alps
Mountains of South Tyrol
Alpine three-thousanders
Rieserferner Group
Austria–Italy border
International mountains of Europe
Rieserferner-Ahrn Nature Park
Geography of East Tyrol